Come September is a 1961 American romantic comedy film directed by Robert Mulligan and starring Rock Hudson, Gina Lollobrigida, Sandra Dee and Bobby Darin.

Plot 
Wealthy American businessman Robert Talbot owns a villa on the Ligurian coast, where he and his Roman mistress Lisa Fellini spend September each year. When Robert visits in July and calls Lisa en route from Milano, she cancels her wedding and rushes to meet him. Upon his arrival at the villa, Robert discovers that in his absence, his major domo Maurice Clavell has converted the villa into a hotel, currently hosting a group of teenage girls including Sandy and their chaperone Margaret Allison. Their departure is delayed when Margaret slips on the cork of a champagne bottle and is forced to spend a day in the hospital. Four teenage boys, led by Tony, who had irritated Robert on the drive to his villa, set up camp outside the villa and begin courting the girls.

Robert chaperones the girls on a sightseeing tour and to a music club. He dances with each of the girls and appeals to their virtues, stressing the importance of chastity. A drunken Tony makes a failed romantic advance toward Sandy. When Sandy tells Lisa of the lecture that she had received from Robert, Lisa becomes infuriated over Robert's double standards. The next morning, she departs, hoping to reunite with her former fiancé Spencer.
 
Accompanied by Maurice, Robert chases after Lisa, but she refuses to reconcile. Maurice decides to play matchmaker, telling the police that his employer is a notorious criminal wanted in Rome and that Lisa is his accomplice, but his plan fails. Lisa returns to her apartment, where she finds Sandy. Hearing Sandy's lament about lost love, Lisa experiences an epiphany and departs to reunite with Robert. On her way out, she meets Tony, whom she directs to her apartment, where he and Sandy reunite.
  
At the train station, Lisa borrows a toddler to convince the conductor that the father is abandoning them. Taken off the train, Robert reconciles with her. As a married couple, they return to the villa, which Maurice has converted into a hotel again and which is now occupied by a group of nuns.

Cast 
 Rock Hudson as Robert L. Talbot
 Gina Lollobrigida as Lisa Helena Fellini
 Sandra Dee as Sandy Stevens
 Bobby Darin as Tony
 Walter Slezak as Maurice Clavell
 Brenda de Banzie as Margaret Allison
 Rossana Rory as Anna
 Ronald Howard as Spencer
 Joel Grey as Beagle
 Ronnie Haran as Sparrow
 Chris Seitz as Larry
 Cindy Conroy as Julia
 Joan Freeman as Linda
 Nancy Anderson as Patricia
 Michael Eden as Ron
 Claudia Brack as Carol

Production 

Screenwriters Stanley Shapiro and Maurice Richlin began work on the script in late 1959. While the film was in preproduction, Shapiro said in an interview: "I write all day at my office from 8:30 until 6:00, then have dinner and go home and spend two or three hours fixing, polishing or rewriting the day's output."

In early 1960, it was announced that Rock Hudson and Gina Lollobrigida were set to star. Before Lollobrigida's participation was confirmed, Marilyn Monroe was rumored to be cast. It was also announced that production was to be delayed until Hudson completed work on The Last Sunset (1961). Lollobrigida also had commitments to the films Go Naked in the World (1961) and Lady L (1965). In June 1960, Robert Mulligan signed on as the film's director.<ref>Anderson Daily Bulletin - June 9, 1960, Anderson, Indiana. p.34: Robert Mulligan Is Signed To Direct Two More Films</ref>

A month later, it was announced that singer Bobby Darin was to make his film debut in Come September. He and Sandra Dee met while on location, fell in love and married on December 1, 1960. The making of Come September is portrayed in the 2004 Darin biopic Beyond the Sea, starring Kevin Spacey as Darin and Kate Bosworth as Dee.

Lollobrigida was initially reluctant because she was not enthusiastic about returning to Italy, where the film was shot. In an interview, she mentioned accepting the role because it allowed her to work with Hudson and explained: "It's a comedy that can only be made in Italy."

 Music 
Bobby Darin composed the Come September theme as well as the song "Multiplication" that he performs in the film.

 Novelization 
In advance of the film's release, a paperback novelization of the film written by crime and mystery novelist Marvin H. Albert was published by Dell Books.

 Reception 
With Rotten Tomatoes, Come September has an 80% score based on five critics' reviews.

 Remakes Come September has been remade as the Hindi-language films Kashmir Ki Kali (1964) and Mere Sanam (1965) and as the Tamil-language film Anbe Vaa (1966). The 1980 Hindi film Ek Baar Kaho was also loosely based on Come September''.

See also 
 List of American films of 1961

References

External links
 
 
 

1961 films
American romantic comedy films
1961 romantic comedy films
1960s English-language films
Films set in Italy
Films directed by Robert Mulligan
Universal Pictures films
Films set in country houses
Films scored by Hans J. Salter
1960s American films